Hoss is Lagwagon's third album, released on November 21, 1995 by Fat Wreck Chords. It was produced by Ryan Greene.

This is the last Lagwagon album to feature drummer Derrick Plourde before his departure in 1996 (and subsequently his death in 2005) and guitarist Shaun Dewey before his departure in 1997. They would be replaced temporarily by Ken Stringfellow (The Posies) on guitar, and permanently by Dave Raun (RKL) on drums.

The cover hosts a photo of Dan Blocker as his famous character Eric "Hoss" Cartwright from the Western television show Bonanza.

The album was also supported by a 1995 tour. Some footage of the tour can be seen in the music video for the song "Razor Burn", a popular song from the album.

"Razor Burn" was released to radio on February 1, 2005.

Track listing 
All songs written by Joey Cape.
 "Kids Don't Like to Share" – 2:40
 "Violins" – 3:07
 "Name Dropping" – 2:33
 "Bombs Away" – 3:26
 "Move the Car" – 3:20
 "Sleep" – 1:55
 "Sick" – 2:56
 "Rifle" – 2:52
 "Weak" – 2:36
 "Black Eyes" – 3:13
 "Bro Dependent" – 1:39
 "Razor Burn" – 2:37
 "Shaving Your Head" – 2:42
 "Ride the Snake" – 3:09

References

External links

Hoss at YouTube (streamed copy where licensed)

Lagwagon albums
1995 albums
Fat Wreck Chords albums
Albums produced by Ryan Greene